Jason Thomas Donald (born September 4, 1984) is an American former professional baseball utility player. He played in Major League Baseball (MLB) for the Cleveland Indians.

Early life
Donald attended Buchanan High School in Clovis, California, where his father is the coach of the baseball team. He played college baseball for the University of Arizona. In 2004 and 2005, he played collegiate summer baseball with the Cotuit Kettleers of the Cape Cod Baseball League, and was named a league all-star in 2005.

Professional career

Philadelphia Phillies
Donald was drafted by the Philadelphia Phillies in the third round (97th overall pick) of the 2006 MLB draft. He was originally drafted by the Anaheim Angels in the 20th round of the 2003 MLB draft directly from high school, but chose not to sign.

Donald was selected and participated in several All-Star games during the course of the 2008 season including the Eastern League All-Star game, and the premier event for minor leaguers, the MLB All-Star Futures Game (which in 2008 was played at Yankee Stadium).

In 2009, Donald played nine games with the Gulf Coast League Phillies, going 6 for 26 (.231) before being assigned to the Lehigh Valley IronPigs of the International League. While with the Pigs, Jason had a .236 batting average with one home run over the course of 51 games.

On July 29, 2009, the Phillies traded Donald, along with Carlos Carrasco, Lou Marson, and Jason Knapp to the Cleveland Indians for Cliff Lee and Ben Francisco.

Cleveland Indians

On May 18, 2010, replacing injured Cleveland Indians shortstop Asdrúbal Cabrera, Donald played against the Tampa Bay Rays and recorded his first major league hit on his first plate appearance. In his second at bat, he singled to right field against Rays starter David Price to begin his major league career 2-for-2. He then walked in his third at bat.

On June 2, 2010, Donald was the 27th batter faced by  Armando Galarraga, who was one out away from pitching a perfect game. Donald hit a ground ball to the right side of first baseman Miguel Cabrera, who fielded the ball cleanly and tossed the ball to Galarraga, who was covering first base. First base umpire Jim Joyce called Donald safe, but replay showed that the throw beat Donald by one step.

Cincinnati Reds

On December 11, 2012, Donald was traded to the Cincinnati Reds in a three-team deal that also involved the Arizona Diamondbacks.  Shin-Soo Choo went with Donald to Cincinnati.  Cleveland acquired Drew Stubbs from the Reds and Trevor Bauer, Matt Albers and Bryan Shaw from the Diamondbacks.  Arizona received Lars Anderson and Tony Sipp from the Indians and Didi Gregorius from the Reds.

Kansas City Royals
Donald signed a minor league deal with the Kansas City Royals on December 28, 2013.

Texas Rangers
On May 28, 2014, Donald was traded to the Texas Rangers for cash considerations. He became a free agent after the 2014 season.

Olympics
Donald and Indians backup catcher Lou Marson were selected to the United States national baseball team. Donald helped lead the United States to a bronze medal at the 2008 Summer Olympics. Donald homered in the bronze medal game and led the team at the games in batting average, on-base percentage and slugging percentage. Donald batted .381 for the Games.

Awards and honors
In 2008, Donald received the Arizona Fall League's Dernell Stenson Sportsmanship Award.

References

External links

Scout.com profile
Team USA profile

1984 births
Living people
Baseball players at the 2008 Summer Olympics
Olympic bronze medalists for the United States in baseball
Sportspeople from Clovis, California
Sportspeople from Modesto, California
Baseball players from California
Cleveland Indians players
Arizona Wildcats baseball players
Batavia Muckdogs players
Lakewood BlueClaws players
Clearwater Threshers players
Florida Complex League Phillies players
Lehigh Valley IronPigs players
Reading Phillies players
Columbus Clippers players
Louisville Bats players
Omaha Storm Chasers players
Round Rock Express players
Cotuit Kettleers players
Medalists at the 2008 Summer Olympics